Ismael Carbonell Samé (born 5 February 1959) is a Cuban rower. He competed at the 1980 Summer Olympics and the 1992 Summer Olympics.

Notes

References

External links
 

1959 births
Living people
Cuban male rowers
Olympic rowers of Cuba
Rowers at the 1980 Summer Olympics
Rowers at the 1992 Summer Olympics
People from Santiago de Cuba Province
Pan American Games gold medalists for Cuba
Pan American Games medalists in rowing
Rowers at the 1979 Pan American Games
Rowers at the 1983 Pan American Games
Rowers at the 1987 Pan American Games
Rowers at the 1991 Pan American Games
Rowers at the 1995 Pan American Games
Rowers at the 1999 Pan American Games
Medalists at the 1979 Pan American Games